Moose Pond is located in the towns of Bridgton, Denmark and Sweden, in the state of  Maine. Camp Winona, a camp for boys, Camp Wyonegonic, a camp for girls, and Shawnee Peak Ski Area, a ski resort, are located on the lake.

Statistics 
 Total lake area -   
 Maximum recorded depth - 
 Mean depth - 
 Volume - 
 Watershed - 
 Elevation - 
 Shorefront lots - 497

Fishing

The lake supports landlocked salmon and lake trout in the middle basin.  The pond also supports populations of largemouth bass, has Maine's record 11 lb large mouth bass, smallmouth bass, yellow perch, white perch, chain pickerel, hornpout, rainbow smelt, white sucker, fallfish, golden shiners, pumpkinseed sunfish and slimy
sculpin.

References

Lakes of Cumberland County, Maine
Lakes of Oxford County, Maine
Bridgton, Maine
Lakes of Maine